Vijay Shankar Vyas (21 August 1931 – 12 September 2018) was a noted agricultural economist of India. He hailed from Pushkarna Brahmin community in Bikaner and authored six books. Vyas died on 12 September 2018.

Career
Vyas was the Director of IIM, Ahmedabad; IDS, Jaipur and Senior Advisor, Agriculture and Rural Development Department, the world Bank. Professor Vyas was Emeritus Professor at the Institute of Development Studies, Jaipur. He was a member of the Central Board of Directors of the Reserve Bank of India.

Education
Vyas authored / co-authored six books and published numerous articles in notable national and international journals. He was invited to deliver lectures and keynotes in many workshops and seminars in India and abroad. The contribution made him an honorary life member of the International Association of Agricultural Economists. He was elected as a Fellow of the National Academy of Agricultural Sciences.

Awards
Vyas received the Padma Bhushan award in 2006 from the Government of India. He was honoured at the award ceremony by the President of India on Republic Day. Vyas served as Chairman and Member of Boards, at International, National and State Level.

References

External links
Vijay Shankar Vyas at realbikaner.com
 

1931 births
2018 deaths
Indian agricultural economists
Recipients of the Padma Bhushan in literature & education
Rajasthani people
People from Bikaner
21st-century Indian economists
Scientists from Rajasthan